Adel Al-Anezi (born 6 February 1977) is a Kuwaiti former footballer. He competed in the men's tournament at the 2000 Summer Olympics.

References

External links
 

1977 births
Living people
Kuwaiti footballers
Olympic footballers of Kuwait
Footballers at the 2000 Summer Olympics
Place of birth missing (living people)
Association football midfielders
Kuwait SC players
Kuwait Premier League players